The 2007 Copa Libertadores de América (officially the 2007 Copa Toyota Libertadores de América for sponsorship reasons) was the 48th edition of the Copa Libertadores. It started on January 24, 2007, and finished on June 20, 2007. It was won by Boca Juniors, who earned their 6th Copa Libertadores title. They won the Libertadores with Miguel Angel Russo.

Qualified teams

First stage

  
|}

Second stage

Group 1

Group 2

Group 3

Group 4

Group 5

Group 6

Group 7

Group 8

Knockout stages

The teams were seeded 1 to 8 (first placed teams of each group) and 9 to 16 (second placed teams of each group); the best seeds played the worst seeds. To prevent a final with two teams from the same country, CONMEBOL paired Santos with Grêmio and Boca Juniors with Cúcuta Deportivo in the semifinals.

Seeding

Bracket

Finals

Top goalscorers

See also
2007 FIFA Club World Cup
2008 Recopa Sudamericana

References

External links
Copa Toyota Libertadores at CONMEBOL.com
Interliga Official Site

 
1
Copa Libertadores seasons